Dawson R. Engler is an American computer scientist and an associate professor of computer science and electrical engineering at Stanford University.

Career 
After graduating from University of Arizona, Engler earned his Ph.D. from the Massachusetts Institute of Technology in 1998 while working with Frans Kaashoek in the MIT CSAIL Parallel and Distributed Operating Systems Group. The focus of his graduate studies was the exokernel.

Engler is currently an associate professor of computer science and electrical engineering at Stanford University. In 2002, he co-founded Coverity with several of his students to commercialize his group's work in static code analysis for bug-finding technology.

Awards and honors 
Engler and his co-authors received the Best Paper award at USENIX's OSDI conferences in 2000, 2004, and 2008. With his students Cristian Cadar and Daniel Dunbar, he was jointly awarded the 2018 SIGOPS Hall of Fame Award for their paper at the 2008 conference.

Engler won the 2006 SIGOPS Mark Weiser Award for his work in operating systems research. In 2008, he received the Grace Murray Hopper Award for "ground-breaking work on automated program checking and bug-finding".

Selected publications

References

External links 
 Dawson Engler on the Stanford University website
 

Living people
American computer scientists
Programming language researchers
Software testing people
Arizona State University alumni
Massachusetts Institute of Technology alumni
Stanford University faculty
Stanford University Department of Electrical Engineering faculty
Grace Murray Hopper Award laureates
Year of birth missing (living people)